African Journals OnLine (AJOL) is a South African non-profit organisation, headquartered in Grahamstown, which is dedicated to improving the online visibility and access to the published scholarly research of African-based academics. By using the internet as a gateway, AJOL aims to enhance conditions for African learning as well as African development.

Information inequality 
Of the 50 countries throughout the world classified as Least Developed Countries (LDCs) by the United Nations, 33 are in Africa. There is widespread awareness of the importance of education in addressing poverty in the long term, usually with an emphasis on primary and secondary education. A concurrent focus on higher education in the continent is also needed for African countries to sustainably develop their capacity and economies and lift the region out of underdevelopment.

Primarily due to difficulties accessing them, African research papers have been under-utilised, under-valued and under-cited in the international and African research arenas. To date, the main information resources, published journals and journal articles available to and used by researchers, librarians and students in Africa are the same as those used in Europe and America. This is because information from the developed world is usually more readily available than that of developing countries. However, it does not adequately reflect the research output of Africa and is not always relevant or appropriate for higher education in Africa. Although access to global information resources is essential; equally important and essential is access to the local research output from the continent.

Despite the wide range of capacity and resources within and between African countries, a legitimate generalization is that strengthening research and research-publishing are crucial priorities for improving higher education in Africa. At the same time as information sources from the developed world are currently made available for free to Africa (such as HINARI, AGORA, OARE (Online Access to Research in the Environment), JSTOR African Access Initiative, and Aluka), there needs to be a corresponding focus on the online availability of information from Africa if increased local capacity in research and dissemination is to be attained. To this end, in a high-tech, information hungry and rapidly globalising world, higher education in Africa needs technological tools to share and build on its own research output with neighbouring countries and the rest of the world.

Scholarly journals remain a vital and entrenched means of academic communication. In the information age, providing electronic access to journals is becoming the norm if that research is to reach the international audience who need to be aware of it. Many worthy peer-reviewed scholarly journals publishing from Africa lack the means to host their content online in isolation. Others do have sufficient resources but cannot attain the online visibility necessary to increase awareness of the valuable research contained within. There is a need to support the ongoing functioning and sustainability of journals publishing research from Africa.

Increasing access to African information 
The mission of AJOL is to support African research and counter the "North-South" and "West-East" inequality of information flow by facilitating awareness of and access to research published in Africa. Information from developed countries is not necessarily as relevant or appropriate for Africa as that from within the continent. AJOL provides an online system for the aggregation of African-published scholarly journals and offers global access to and visibility of the research output of the continent. As such, AJOL's primary beneficiaries are scholarly, peer-reviewed, African-published journals, and secondary (also direct) beneficiaries are African and international members of the scholarly community needing to access African-published research.

AJOL hosts African-published, peer-reviewed scholarly journals for free – and includes both open access and subscription-based journals. The meta-data of all participating journals is open access on the AJOL website. AJOL also provides an article download service for researchers to access full text of individual articles.

AJOL hosts over 350 peer-reviewed journals from 27 African countries covering a variety of disciplines including health, education, agriculture, science and technology, the environment, and arts and culture. The number of participating journals and researchers using the service is growing continuously. AJOL hopes to eventually include all quality, peer-reviewed journals on the continent. 

The AJOL website receives over 100,000 visits per month from over 190 countries around the world.

Background 
The AJOL project was initiated in 1998 by the International Network for the Availability of Scientific Publications (INASP), a charitable organisation based in Oxford, in the United Kingdom. After a positive evaluation of the pilot in early 2000, AJOL was re-launched and expanded. Through INASP, AJOL formed a partnership with the Public Knowledge Project (PKP) relating to the open source software that underpins AJOL's online services.  Following the proven need for the AJOL model in developing countries, INASP is currently establishing similar fledgling "JOL"s in Bangladesh, Vietnam and Nepal.

Partner organisations 
 667 participating African scholarly journals including 371 open access journals.
 International Network for the Availability of Scientific Publications; Collaborating with a wide network of partners in sister organisations, development agencies and publishers, INASP has implemented programmes in more than 40 countries worldwide. These programmes are designed for stakeholders engaged in all stages of the research communication cycle, with activities targeted to the needs of researchers, editors, national publishers, and librarians as well as ICT professionals. Following on from successfully initiating and establishing AJOL, INASP has established similar online journal projects in other regions, particularly in South and South East Asia. INASP also runs the Programme for the Enhancement of Research Information (PERI), which provides support to researchers around the world through access to information and training and support for the use of information.
 NISC SA; NISC SA (www.nisc.co.za) is an electronic publishing company specialising in bibliographic database products and African academic literature.
 The Public Knowledge Project; The Public Knowledge Project is a federally funded research initiative at the University of British Columbia and Simon Fraser University on the west coast of Canada. It seeks to improve the scholarly and public quality of academic research through the development of innovative online environments. PKP has developed free, open source software for the management, publishing, and indexing of journals and conferences. Open Journal Systems and Open Conference Systems increase access to knowledge, improve management, and reduce publishing costs. The AJOL database was developed using the open-source journal management software called Open Journal Systems (OJS). Working collaboratively with this organisation, AJOL has been able to create a high quality website with greatly enhanced functionality.
The Association of African Universities

Donor partners 
AJOL is currently supported by the Ford Foundation and through INASP's Programme for the Enhancement of Research Information, by the Royal Danish Ministry of Foreign Affairs (RDMFA), Sida, the UK Department for International Development (DFID) and the Norwegian Agency for Development Cooperation (Norad).

African Journals Online participates in the WorldWideScience global science gateway.

Hosted journals

Active journals
Some of the journals hosted by AJOL are:
 Acta Theologica)
 African Environment
 African Journal of Aquatic Science
 African Journal of Cross-Cultural Psychology and Sport Facilitation
 African Journal of Educational Studies in Mathematics and Sciences

Discontinued journals
AJOL also hosts the archives of several discontinued journals:

 African Journal of Political Economy, see African Journal of Political Science
 African Journal of Political Science (1997–2003, ; from 1986 to 1990 published as African Journal of Political Economy )
 African Journal of Applied Zoology, see African Journal of Applied Zoology and Environmental Biology
 African Journal of Applied Zoology and Environmental Biology (1999–2006, ; original title African Journal of Applied Zoology)
 African Journal of Science and Technology
 African Studies Monograph (2001–2007,

See also
Bangladesh Journals Online
Open access in South Africa
Open Access Scholarly Publishers Association

References

Further reading 
 Lor, P. and J. J. Britz (2004). "Information imperialism: Moral problems in information flow from South to North" Information ethics in the electronic age: current issues in Africa and the world T. Mendoza and J. J. Britz. Jefferson, North Carolina, McFarland Publishing Company: 15–21.
 
 
 
 Teferra, D. and Altbach, C. "African Higher Education: Challenges for the 21st Century" Higher Education 47 (January, 2004), pp. 21–50

External links 
 
 

Non-profit organisations based in South Africa
South African digital libraries
Academic journal online publishing platforms
Internet properties established in 1998